Alyn Camara (born 31 March 1989 in Bergisch Gladbach) is a German long jumper of Senegalese descent. He competed at the 2012 Summer Olympics in London and the 2016 Summer Olympics in Rio, but failed to qualify for the final.

Competition record

References

External links 
 
 

1989 births
Living people
People from Bergisch Gladbach
Sportspeople from Cologne (region)
Athletes (track and field) at the 2012 Summer Olympics
Athletes (track and field) at the 2016 Summer Olympics
Olympic athletes of Germany
World Athletics Championships athletes for Germany
German people of Senegalese descent
German male long jumpers